These are the late night schedules for the four United States broadcast networks that offer programming during this time period, from September 1995 to August 1996. All times are Eastern or Pacific. Affiliates will fill non-network schedule with local, syndicated, or paid programming. Affiliates also have the option to preempt or delay network programming at their discretion.

Legend

Schedule

Monday-Friday

Saturday

By network

ABC

Returning series
ABC in Concert
ABC World News Now
ABC World News This Morning
Nightline

CBS

Returning series
CBS Morning News
Late Show with David Letterman
The Late Late Show with Tom Snyder
Up to the Minute

Not returning from 1994-95:
Crimetime After Primetime
The Kids in the Hall

Fox

New series
MADtv
Saturday Night Special

Not returning from 1994-95:
Tales from the Crypt

NBC

Returning series
Friday Night
Late Night with Conan O'Brien
Later
NBC News at Sunrise
NBC Nightside
Saturday Night Live
The Tonight Show with Jay Leno

United States late night network television schedules
1995 in American television
1996 in American television